Westbourne is an electoral ward of Chichester District, West Sussex, England, named for the local village of Westbourne, and returns one member to sit on Chichester District Council.

Following a district boundary review, the former ward of Funtington was split and merged into Westbourne in 2019.

Councillor

Election results

* Elected

References

External links
 Chichester District Council
 Election Maps

Wards of Chichester District